The Russian Cycling Federation or ФВСР (in Russian: Федерация велосипедного спорта России) is the national governing body of cycle racing in Russia. Its headquarters are located in Moscow. The President is Igor Viktorovich Makarov, President and proprietor of ITERA International Group of Companies (ITERA Group).

The Russian Cycling Federation is a member of the UCI and the UEC.

After the 2022 Russian invasion of Ukraine, the UCI forbade Russian teams from competing in international events.  It also stripped Russia of scheduled events. The UEC announced that Russian officials will not be able to officiate at any UEC event, or attend or take part in any UEC meeting, committee, or forum.

External links

References

National members of the European Cycling Union
Cycle racing organizations
Cycling
Cycle racing in Russia